Bing Rodrigo (1954 – 2001) was a Filipino singer most famous for songs such as "Bakit May Pag-ibig Pa" and "Gintong Araw". He was also known to have sung the most memorable jingle in all of Philippine culture, the "Seiko Wallet" commercial. He was contemporary to Jun Polistico, Anthony Castelo and Nonoy Zuñiga, and was crowned "King of Tagalog Songs" in 1982, and scored a number of gold records. He died in 2001.

Discography
 "Bakit May Pag-ibig Pa"
 "'Di Ko Ipagpapalit"
 "Gintong Araw"
 "Hiram Lamang"
 "Huwag Ka Nang Lumuha"
 "Ikaw Pa Rin"
 "Magbalik Ka"
 "Mahal Mo Pala Ako"
 "May Pag-ibig Pa Ba?"
 "May Silangan Pa"
 "Minamahal Kita"
 "Sinayang Mo"
 "Sugat sa Tinik"

References

External links
 Artist Rodrigo. Titik Pilipino. Accessed on August 24, 2009.

1954 births
2001 deaths
20th-century Filipino male singers